Ion Overman (born November 9, 1976) is an American actress, known for her roles on television, such as Gabriella Garza in Port Charles (2000–2002), Candace Jewell in The L Word (2004–2005), Detective Sam Blair in Ghost Whisperer (2008–2010) and Detective Elena Ruiz in Wisdom of the Crowd (2017–2018).

Early life
Overman was born in Los Angeles, California. Overman's mother is African-American and her father is of English heritage from the United Kingdom. At the age of thirteen, she made her debut at the Chip Fields Repertory Theater. She graduated from University of California, Los Angeles and landed her first agent in 1993.

Career
Overman made her acting debut in the 1995 movie The Walking Dead. In 2000, she was cast as Gabriela Garza in the ABC daytime soap opera General Hospital, a character who also appeared in the General Hospital spinoff Port Charles. She left the role in 2002. She later went to appear in an guest starring roles on the number of prime time television series, include Strong Medicine, The Drew Carey Show and CSI: Crime Scene Investigation. From 2004 to 2005, she had a recurring role as Candace Jewell in the Showtime drama series The L Word.

From 2005 to 2006, Overman starred in the UPN sitcom Love Inc. The series was canceled after single season. She has appeared in the 2006 comedy film Phat Girlz and played  Linda, Josh's (Derek Luke) elitist and corrupt fiance in Tyler Perry's 2009 comedy-drama Madea Goes to Jail. In 2013, Ion starred in the Tunnel Vision as the detective trying to find the murderer and who befriends the murdered family's patriarch, who also barely survived being murdered.

Overman had a recurring role on Ghost Whisperer from 2008 to 2010 playing Det. Sam Blair. She also had a recurring arc on Desperate Housewives playing Maria Scott during season five. She also has appeared on Two and a Half Men, Castle and NCIS. From 2017 to 2018, Overman co-starred as Det. Elena Ruiz on the CBS drama series, Wisdom of the Crowd.

Filmography

Film

Television

References

External links

Ion Overman on Twitter

1976 births
Actresses from Los Angeles
American soap opera actresses
American television actresses
Living people
American film actresses
African-American actresses
Actresses from California
People from Los Angeles
20th-century American actresses
21st-century American actresses
20th-century African-American women
20th-century African-American people
21st-century African-American women
21st-century African-American people